Marcel Gery (in Czech and Slovak Marcel Géry; born March 15, 1965) is a former butterfly swimmer, who was born in Czechoslovakia and competed for the Czechoslovak national team in international competitions.

At the 1985 Summer Universiade, Gery won a bronze medal in the 200-metre freestyle.

He later emigrated to Canada and competed for the Canadian national team at the 1992 Summer Olympics in Barcelona, Spain. There he won bronze medal with the men's 4×100-metres medley relay team, alongside Mark Tewksbury, Jonathan Cleveland and Stephen Clarke.

See also
 List of Commonwealth Games medallists in swimming (men)
 List of Olympic medalists in swimming (men)

References

External links
 Marcel Gery at Swimming Canada
 
 
 
 
 

1965 births
Living people
People from Trnava District
Sportspeople from the Trnava Region
Czechoslovak emigrants to Canada
Canadian male butterfly swimmers
Canadian male freestyle swimmers
European Aquatics Championships medalists in swimming
Olympic bronze medalists for Canada
Olympic bronze medalists in swimming
Olympic swimmers of Canada
Slovak male swimmers
Swimmers at the 1992 Summer Olympics
Swimmers at the 1990 Commonwealth Games
Medalists at the 1992 Summer Olympics
Commonwealth Games gold medallists for Canada
Commonwealth Games silver medallists for Canada
Commonwealth Games bronze medallists for Canada
Czechoslovak male swimmers
Commonwealth Games medallists in swimming
Universiade medalists in swimming
Slovak emigrants to Canada
Universiade bronze medalists for Czechoslovakia
Medalists at the 1985 Summer Universiade
Medallists at the 1990 Commonwealth Games